SS Green Harbour was a  built in 1974, operated by the Military Sealift Command during Gulf War.

Construction and commissioning 
Green Harbour was laid down and launched in 1974 at Avondale Shipyard, New Orleans, Louisiana. Put into service later that same year by the Maritime Administration for operation by Central Gulf Lines.

In 1991, the ship was chartered by the Military Sealift Command (MSC) and commissioned into the Maritime Prepositioning Ship Squadron 2, Diego Garcia, as Green Harbour (T-AK-2064). She took part in the Operation Desert Shield.

She was returned to the Central Gulf Lines after the contact with MSC was finished in 2001. The ship was sold for scrap in 2002.

References

Type C9-class ship
1974 ships
Gulf War ships of the United States
Ships built in New Orleans